Oza may refer to:

Title
Ōza (shogi), a title in shogi
Ōza (go), a title in Go

People
Ghanshyam Oza (1911–2002), Indian politician
Goverdhan Lal Oza (1924–?), Indian judge
Kaajal Oza Vaidya (born 1966), Indian author
Kamlesh Oza, Indian actor
Nimit Oza (born 1981), Indian writer and columnist
Ramesh Oza (born 1957), Hindu spiritual leader
Rohan Oza (born 1971), American businessman
Shefali Oza (born 1967), Indian television personality